The canton of Boën-sur-Lignon is a French administrative division located in the department of Loire and the Auvergne-Rhône-Alpes region. At the French canton reorganisation which came into effect in March 2015, the canton was expanded from 18 to 55 communes (7 of which merged into the new communes Chalmazel-Jeansagnière, Vêtre-sur-Anzon and Vézelin-sur-Loire):

Ailleux
Arthun
Boën-sur-Lignon
Bully
Bussy-Albieux
Cervières
Cezay
Chalmazel-Jeansagnière
La Chamba
La Chambonie
Champdieu
Châtelneuf
La Côte-en-Couzan
Débats-Rivière-d'Orpra
Essertines-en-Châtelneuf
Grézolles
L'Hôpital-sous-Rochefort
Leigneux
Luré
Marcilly-le-Châtel
Marcoux
Montverdun
Noirétable
Nollieux
Palogneux
Pommiers-en-Forez
Pralong
Sail-sous-Couzan
Saint-Bonnet-le-Courreau
Saint-Didier-sur-Rochefort
Sainte-Agathe-la-Bouteresse
Sainte-Foy-Saint-Sulpice
Saint-Étienne-le-Molard
Saint-Georges-de-Baroille
Saint-Georges-en-Couzan
Saint-Germain-Laval
Saint-Jean-la-Vêtre
Saint-Julien-d'Oddes
Saint-Just-en-Bas
Saint-Laurent-Rochefort
Saint-Martin-la-Sauveté
Saint-Polgues
Saint-Priest-la-Vêtre
Saint-Sixte
Les Salles
Sauvain
Souternon
Trelins 
La Valla-sur-Rochefort
Vêtre-sur-Anzon
Vézelin-sur-Loire

See also
Cantons of the Loire department

References

Cantons of Loire (department)